Blue Dog may refer to:
 The Blue Dog Coalition, a group of conservative Democratic Party members of the United States House of Representatives
 Blue Dog Lake, a lake in South Dakota
 Blue Dog, a painting and a featured icon in various works by George Rodrigue
 Blue Dog Records was a London-based independent record label linked to the Barfly club
 The Blue Dog, one of the "blue" public houses and inns in Grantham
 The Blue Dogs (band), an American band formed in 1987

See also 
 Blue's Clues, a television show with a dog named Blue
 Blue, a general description for the color of some dogs' coats